Trouble Brewing is a brewery in Kill, County Kildare, Ireland, that produces a number of high end ales, IPAs, stouts, and lagers. The brewery distributes throughout Ireland and in a number of countries in the EU. The brewery was founded by Paul O'Connor, Stephen Clinch, and Thomas Prior in 2009. Trouble Brewing was at the Bord Bía Bloom Festival in 2011. Since June 2011, Trouble Brewing has been the first brewery in Ireland to accept payment in Bitcoin.

Beers 
 Trouble Brewing Deception Golden Ale, 4.3% ABV
 Trouble Brewing Dark Arts Porter, 4.4% ABV
 Trouble Brewing Sabotage IPA, launched 31 January 2013

 Seasonal 
 Pumpkin Brew, a pumpkin-spiced beer for Halloween 
 Spelt Saison, a special-edition brew, served in casks, based on recipe chosen in 2012 "Troublemaker" home brewing competition
 Trouble Brewing Galaxy Pale Ale, 4.5% ABV (N/A)

Brewery 
The brewery uses a computer system based on Arduino hardware, and the brewing control mechanism uses software that has been shared using an open-source usage creative commons attribution share-alike licence.

References

External links
 Official website
 Confessions of a Trouble Maker, Rossa O'Neill, Beoir.org, 11 April 2011.
 Something Brewing in the Curragh, Kildare Nationalist, Sept., 2010.
 New Allenwood Brewery Promoting its First Beer, Liffey Valley Champion, 5 July 2010.

Beer in Ireland
Kildare (town)